This is a list of landscapes in Rhineland-Palatinate covering the regions of the Eifel, Hunsrück, Moselle-Saar, Westerwald, Rhenish Hesse and the Palatinate:

 Ahr Hills
 Ahr Valley
 Alzey Hills
 Bienwald
 Bingen Forest
 Bitburg Land
 Boppard Hamm
 Breisig Ländchen
 Buchfinkenland 
 Cochem Krampen
 Dahner Felsenland
 Eifel
 Einrich
 Gräfenstein Land
 Haardt
 High Eifel
 High Westerwald
 Holzland
 Hunsrück
 Idarwald
 Islek
 Kaiserslauten Basin
 Kannenbäckerland
 Kondelwald
 Kröver Reich
 Kroppach Switzerland
 Kyllwald
 Landstuhl Marsh
 Lützelsoon
 Maifeld
 Mehringen Switzerland
 Meulenwald
 Middle Moselle
 Middle Rhine
 Moselle Hills
 Moselle valley 
 Mosel-Saar-Ruwer
 Nahe valley
 Nahe Uplands
 Neuwied Basin
 Upper Mundat Forest
 Upper Moselle
 Osburg Hochwald
 Pellenz
 Palatine Uplands
 Palatinate Forest
 Palatine Depression
 Palatine Rhine Plain
 Palatinate
 Prümer Kalkmulde
 Rhenish Hesse
 Rhenish-Hessian Switzerland
 Rhenish-Hessian Hills
 Ruwer valley
 Saargau
 Saar valley
 Salmwald
 Schneifel
 Schönecken Switzerland
 Schwarzwälder Hochwald
 Sickingen Heights
 Siegerland
 Soonwald
 Stumpfwald
 South Palatinate
 Trier valley
 Lower Moselle
 Viertäler
 Anterior Palatinate
 Vorderwesterwald
 Vulkan Eifel
 Wasgau
 Weinstraße
 Westerwald 
 Westrich
 Westrich Plateau
 Wildenburg Land
 Wittlich Depression
 Wonnegau
 Zeller Hamm
 Zweibrücken Hills

See also 
 List of regions of Saxony
 Little Switzerland (landscape)

!
Landscapes